Lusardi's is a Northern Italian restaurant located at 1494 Second Avenue (between East 77th and East 78th Streets) on the Upper East Side of Manhattan, in New York City.

The restaurant opened in 1982.  It is owned and run by two brothers, Luigi and Mauro Lusardi. The restaurant has an old-world vibe. The dining room has a capacity of 75 guests. The menu consists of Northern Italian Tuscan dishes. The wine list has over 400 vintage wines.
The chef is Claudio Meneghini.

When Leon Hess owned the New York Jets, he would eat dinner after almost every home game at Lusardi's.

Reviews
In 2012, Zagat's gave it a 24 rating for food.

References

External links
Lusardi's website

Italian-American culture in New York City
Italian restaurants in New York City
Restaurants established in 1982
Restaurants in Manhattan
Upper East Side
1982 establishments in New York City